Saint-Solve is a commune in the Corrèze department in central France. Vignols-Saint-Solve station has rail connections to Brive-la-Gaillarde, Saint-Yrieix and Limoges.

Population

See also
Communes of the Corrèze department

References

Communes of Corrèze
Corrèze communes articles needing translation from French Wikipedia